Events from the 1260s in England.

Incumbents
Monarch – Henry III

Events

 1260
Llywelyn ap Gruffudd attacks English forces in South Wales.
 22 August – truce agreed between England and Wales.
 1261
 Early – following disputes, northern academics from the University of Cambridge attempt to set up a university at Northampton, suppressed by the Crown in 1265.
 12 June – King Henry III of England obtains a papal bull releasing him from the Provisions of Oxford, setting the stage for a civil war over the power struggle between the crown and the aristocracy.
 July – Henry regains control of the government.
 1262
Consecration of a priory church in Oxford, probably the largest of the Dominican Order in England.
Canonisation of Richard of Chichester.
 1263
 January – Provisions of Westminster re-issued.
 April – Simon de Montfort, 6th Earl of Leicester, seizes control of southern England after Henry refuses to accept the Provisions of Oxford.
 16 July – rebels occupy London.
 2 October – Henry travels to Boulogne for an attempt to broker peace by King Louis IX of France; barons refuse to accept terms.
 Presumed date – Balliol College established in the University of Oxford by John I de Balliol on its modern-day site.
 1264 
 23 January – King Louis IX of France issues the Mise of Amiens, a settlement between King Henry III of England and barons led by Simon de Montfort heavily favouring the former, which leads to the Second Barons' War.
 February – Second Barons' War begins as Henry returns to fight Simon de Montfort's rebels.
 April – targeting of Jews during the conflict with the Barons: Gilbert de Clare, 6th Earl of Hertford, leads a massacre of the Jews at Canterbury; at about the same time, another of de Montfort's followers, John fitz John, leads a massacre of Jews in London.
 17–26 April – Second Barons' War: de Montfort besieges Rochester Castle in Kent but fails to take it.
 14 May – Second Barons' War: the Battle of Lewes is fought between Simon de Montfort and King Henry III in Sussex. By the end of the battle, Montfort's forces capture both King Henry and his son, Prince Edward, and Henry is forced to sign the Mise of Lewes making Montfort the "uncrowned king of England".
 June – Simon de Montfort summons a parliament in London, the first to include Knights of the Shire.
 17 June – A fire destroys many of the wooden houses in the city of Gloucester.
 12 August – Peace of Canterbury: papal legate and King Louis IX of France condemn the rebels, who are later excommunicated.
 14 September – Walter de Merton formally completes the foundation of the House of Scholars of Merton (later Merton College, Oxford) to provide education in Malden and the University of Oxford.
 In the Peerage of England, the title Baron de Ros, the oldest continuously held peerage title in England, is created by writ of summons.
 1265 
 20 January – Montfort's Parliament, the first to include burgesses, and to insist that members be elected, assembles at Westminster.
 28 May – Second Barons' War: Prince Edward escapes from captivity and rejoins royalist forces.
 22 June – Simon de Montfort signs a treaty with Llywelyn ap Gruffudd, recognising his rule over Wales.
 4 August – Second Barons' War: The Battle of Evesham is fought in Worcestershire, with the army of Edward defeating the forces of rebellious barons led by Simon de Montfort and killing Montfort and many of his allies.
 16 September – Second Barons' War: Henry disinherits all rebels against his rule.
 1266 
 June – Second Barons' War: Henry III besieges the rebels in Kenilworth Castle.
 July – Second Barons' War: Liverpool Castle surrenders to Henry III's son, Edmund Crouchback, 1st Earl of Lancaster.
 31 October – Second Barons' War: The war winds down as supporters of the slain rebel leader Simon de Montfort make an offer of peace to the king in the Dictum of Kenilworth.
 14 December – Kenilworth surrenders.
 1267 
 9 April – Second Barons' War: Gilbert de Clare, 6th Earl of Hertford occupies London.
 June – Second Barons' War: Prince Edward captures the Isle of Ely, and the remaining rebels surrender.
 Summer – Second Barons' War: rebels and King Henry III agree to peace terms as laid out in the Dictum of Kenilworth.
 29 September – Treaty of Montgomery: King Henry III acknowledges Llywelyn ap Gruffudd's title of Prince of Wales.
 19 November – the Statute of Marlborough is passed, confirming the Magna Carta and the Provisions of Westminster. It is the oldest English law still (partially) in force.
 Roger Bacon completes his work Opus Majus and sends it to Pope Clement IV, who had requested it be written; the work contains wide-ranging discussion of mathematics, optics, alchemy, astronomy, astrology and other topics, and includes what some believe to be the first description of a magnifying glass. Bacon also completes Opus Minus, a summary of Opus Majus, later in the same year.
 Howden Minster in Yorkshire becomes a collegiate church.
 1268
 The first Year Books (annual law reports) appear.
 Approximate date – Henry de Bracton dies leaving the first substantial work on English law, De Legibus et Consuetudinibus Angliae, incomplete.
 1269
 13 October – dedication of the newly rebuilt Westminster Abbey.

Births
 1260
Henry de Cobham, 1st Baron Cobham (died 1339)
 1261
 1 February – Walter de Stapledon, bishop (died 1326)
 1262
Hugh le Despenser, 1st Earl of Winchester (died 1326)
 1267
 3 February – Richard FitzAlan, 8th Earl of Arundel (died 1302)

Deaths
 1260
 c. 8 September – John Crakehall, Lord High Treasurer of England and Archdeacon of Bedford (year of birth unknown)
 5 December – Aymer de Valence, Bishop of Winchester (born c. 1222)
 1262
 15 July – Richard de Clare, 5th Earl of Hertford, soldier (born 1222)
 1263
 Hamo de Crevecoeur, Lord Warden of the Cinque Ports (year of birth unknown)
 1265
 20 January – John Maunsell, Lord Chancellor (born 1190s)
 25 April – Roger de Quincy, 2nd Earl of Winchester, politician (born 1195)
 4 August – killed in the Battle of Evesham:
Hugh le Despencer, 1st Baron le Despencer (born 1223)
 Henry de Montfort (born 1238)
 Peter de Montfort (born c. 1215)
 Simon de Montfort, 6th Earl of Leicester (born 1208)
 1266
Hugh Bigod, Justiciar (born c. 1211)
 1267
John FitzAlan, 6th Earl of Arundel (born 1223)
 1268
 Henry de Bracton, jurist (year of birth unknown)

References